Las Que No Iban A Salir (Spanish for "The Ones That Were Not Coming Out"; stylized in all caps) is the first compilation album by Puerto Rican rapper and singer Bad Bunny. It was released without any previous announcement on May 10, 2020, by Rimas Entertainment. It features guest appearances by Zion & Lennox, Yandel, Don Omar, Nicky Jam, Jhayco, and Bad Bunny's current girlfriend Gabriela.

Background and singles 
Bad Bunny teased some of the songs included on the album on Instagram, one week before the official release. Some songs were presented by him as unreleased tracks that didn't make the final cut of his studio albums X 100pre and YHLQMDLG. Parts of the album were recorded while being in quarantine due to the COVID-19 pandemic. "En Casita" featuring Bad Bunny's girlfriend Gabriela was released on April 4, 2020, as the album's lead single, exclusively on SoundCloud. "Cómo Se Siente (remix)" was released as the album's second single on May 10, 2020, alongside the album.

Commercial performance 
The album debuted at number 7 on the US Billboard 200 with 42,000 album-equivalent units, including 46.2 million streams and 8,000 pure album sales. It marked Bad Bunny's third top 10 album in less than a year. Notably, the album debuted in the top 10 the same week his previous album YHLQMDLG fell out of the top 10 for the first time since its debut on the chart. Also, the album debuted at number one on the US Billboard Top Latin Albums replacing his previous album YHLQMDLG becoming one of the few artist to do that in that chart. Simultaneously, in that same week Bad Bunny held the numbers one, two and three (with YHLQMDLG and X 100pre) on the Top Latin Albums chart, becoming the first time that this happened since Juan Gabriel's death. Las que no iban a salir was the fifth best selling Latin album of 2020 in the United States, with 315,000 equivalent album units.

Track listing 
Songwriting credits adapted from Universal Music Publishing Group's catalog.

Notes
  signifies an uncredited co-producer
 Every song title is stylized in all capital letters, for example, "En Casita" is stylized as "EN CASITA".

Charts

Weekly charts

Year-end charts

Certifications

References 

2020 albums
Bad Bunny albums
Albums produced by Tainy